The 1944 Cork Senior Hurling Championship was the 56th staging of the Cork Senior Hurling Championship since its establishment by the Cork County Board in 1887. The draw for the opening round fixtures took place at the Cork Convention on 30 January 1944. The championship began on 30 April 1944 and ended on 22 October 1944.

St. Finbarr's were the defending champions.

On 22 October 1944, Glen Rovers won the championship following a 5-7 to 3-3 defeat of St. Finbarr's in the final. This was their 9th championship title overall and their first in three championship seasons.

Results

First round

Blackrock received a bye in this round.

Second round

Carrigtwohill and St. Finbarr's received byes in this round.

Semi-finals

Final

References

Cork Senior Hurling Championship
Cork Senior Hurling Championship